David Michael Stoll (born December 1948) is an English composer and educator.

Life and career
David Stoll was born in London, and studied composition at Worcester College, Oxford University, and at the Royal Academy of Music. After completing his education, he has worked as a freelance composer for concert, theatrical, and TV/film music.

Stoll is a Fellow of the Royal Society of Arts. He served as chairman of the Association of Professional Composers. In 1999 he was elected co-chair of the British Academy of Songwriters, Composers and Authors, and has also served on the boards of several other music organizations. Stoll has run several school and corporate training programs in creative thinking based on music, and founded the In Tune In Europe seminar and Building Music program for primary schools.

Works
Stoll is best known for concert and theater work, but composes production music for film, television, and radio, as well.

Selected works include:

Cello Concerto, 2000
The Bowl of Nous, cantata, 1998
Who, If Not I?, cantata, 1998
String Quartet, 1998
Motet in Memoriam for choir
Midwinter Spring for orchestra
False Relations, opera, 1997
Teller of Tales, musical, 1994
If I Were Lifted from Earth, 1998
Pericles, theater, 2000
Gulliver, musical
Gallions Concerto for clarinet and string orchestra
Colcester Suite for pipes
Henry VIII

His music has been recorded and issued on media including:
The Shakespeare Suite, audio CD
String Quartets, audio CD
David Stoll: Reflections on Vedic Scriptures, 1993, audio CD
Stoll: Chamber Music, audio CD

References

1948 births
Living people
English classical composers
English opera composers
Male opera composers
English male classical composers
Musicians from London
English classical organists
British male organists
British film score composers
English film score composers
English male film score composers
21st-century organists
21st-century British male musicians
Male classical organists